The 1986–87 season was Stoke City's 80th season in the Football League and 27th in the Second Division.

Peter Coates became Stoke's new chairman in September 1986 which helped Mills to make a number of useful signings. After a slow start to the season Stoke hit form in November and went on an eleven-match unbeaten run which lasted until the start of February. During this run Stoke beat Leeds United 7–2 and Sheffield United 5–2 which lifted Stoke up the table and in to contention for a place in newly formed Football League play-offs. However, Stoke could not keep up the good results, winning only four of their last 16 matches, finishing in 8th position.

Season review

League
With Mills wanting to bring in new players for the 1986–87 season he had to sell before he could buy, with Ian Painter joining Coventry City for £75,000 and youth team product Neil Adams joined Everton for £150,000, a move which angered the Stoke fans. Into the camp came right back Lee Dixon from Bury for £50,000 and winger Tony Ford from Grimsby Town for £35,000. Stoke again participated in the annual Isle of Man Trophy, but they failed to make it out of the group stage. There was a familiar problem as the season got under way - a lack of goals.

In September 1986 local businessman Peter Coates assumed the role of chairman and a full-strength board backed manager Mills with money for players. In came Mills' former Ipswich Town teammate Brian Talbot from Watford. After 10 matches Stoke were bottom of the table with performances leaving a lot to be desired but the arrival of ex-England international Talbot boosted morale and after striker Nicky Morgan arrived from Portsmouth a remarkable transformation took place. Stoke began to climb the table, going eleven matches without defeat which included a famous 7–2 victory over Leeds United and a 5–2 victory over Sheffield United. As well as Morgan, youngster Carl Saunders started to hit form as Stoke leapt into 4th place and there was great excitement that Stoke could make a return to the First Division. Alas it turned out to be a false dawn as just four wins and five draws in a row in their remaining 16 matches meant Stoke finished the season in 8th spot with 58 points, six away from a play-off spot.

FA Cup
Stoke beat Grimsby Town 6–0 in a second replay and then a victory over Cardiff City saw Stoke drawn against Coventry City in the fifth round. A near full house of 31,255 saw the "Sky Blues" narrowly beat Stoke 1–0 and they went on to lift the cup.

League Cup
Shrewsbury Town who were becoming something of a bogey side for Stoke were able to grind out a 2–1 victory.

Full Members' Cup
Stoke made a quick exit in this season's Full Members' Cup losing at home to Sheffield United 2–1.

Final league table

Results

Legend

Football League Second Division

FA Cup

League Cup

Full Members' Cup

Isle of Man Trophy

Friendlies

Squad statistics

References

Stoke City F.C. seasons
Stoke